Félix  "The Cat"  Potvin (born June 23, 1971) is a Canadian former professional ice hockey goaltender who played 14 seasons in the National Hockey League (NHL).

Early career
As a youth, Potvin played in the 1983 and 1984 Quebec International Pee-Wee Hockey Tournaments with a minor ice hockey team from Mercier, Quebec.

From 1988 through to 1991 Potvin played with the Chicoutimi Saguenéens, a Quebec Major Junior Hockey League (QMJHL) team.  In the 1990–91 season Potvin was awarded the Guy Lafleur Trophy as Playoff MVP.

NHL career
Potvin was drafted in the second round, 31st overall, by the Toronto Maple Leafs in the 1990 National Hockey League entry draft. In the 1991–92 season, Potvin played 35 games for the St. John's Maple Leafs, compiling a 2.93 GAA. For his efforts, Potvin was awarded the Dudley "Red" Garrett Memorial Award (rookie of the year), the Baz Bastien Memorial Trophy as the top goaltender in the AHL and selected to the AHL First All-Star Team. During that season, Potvin was called up to the NHL and saw brief action in 4 games, compiling a 2.28 GAA and a .933 save percentage.

It wasn't until the 1992–93 season that Potvin became a regular in the NHL. That season he played 48 games, compiling a 2.50 GAA (1st in the NHL) and a solid .910 save %. The rapid acceleration of his development led the coaching staff to establish him as their #1 goaltender and prompted the trade of Grant Fuhr to the Buffalo Sabres. That season, Potvin also backstopped the Maple Leafs to the Stanley Cup conference finals, only to lose to the Los Angeles Kings in a grueling seven-game series.  His dynamic performance made him a finalist for the Calder Memorial Trophy.

In the 1993–94 season, Potvin silenced any doubts of a sophomore jinx. He posted 34 wins and a solid 2.89 GAA, including tying Kirk McLean's then NHL record for most wins in October with nine. He was also voted to his first NHL All-Star Game in which his mask art was voted leagues best. In the 1993–94 playoffs, Potvin recorded 3 shutouts in the first-round series against the Chicago Blackhawks, all by a 1–0 margin, including the final NHL game ever played at the illustrious Chicago Stadium. He also became the first Maple Leafs goaltender to stop a penalty shot in a Stanley Cup Playoff game, when he stopped Chicago's Patrick Poulin. Potvin again brought his team to the conference finals, this time losing to the Vancouver Canucks in five games.

In the 1995–96 season, Potvin was selected to his 2nd NHL All-Star Game. However, the Toronto Maple Leafs exited in the first round of the playoffs. The following season, with the aging of the defense corps in front of him, Potvin and the Maple Leafs would miss the playoffs. He would set an NHL record for most shots faced in a season, 2,438, later broken by Roberto Luongo during his stint with the Florida Panthers. In the 1998–99 season, Toronto signed free agent Curtis Joseph, leaving Potvin expendable. He would play in only 5 games due to a knee injury, before he and a sixth-round pick (Fedor Fedorov) were traded to the New York Islanders for defenceman Bryan Berard and a sixth-round pick. Despite the new surroundings, Potvin was unable to reclaim the success he had in Toronto.

The next season, Potvin, and second and third-round draft picks were traded to the Vancouver Canucks for Kevin Weekes, Dave Scatchard, and Bill Muckalt. Potvin struggled with the Canucks and in the 2000–01 season he was dealt to the Los Angeles Kings for future considerations. Immediately, Potvin made an impact leading the Kings to the 7th seed, recording 13 wins and 5 losses.  He had a remarkable 1.96 GAA and a .919 save %.  Potvin led the Kings to a first-round upset of the Detroit Red Wings, and pushed the eventual Stanley Cup Champion Colorado Avalanche to a 7th game in the second round, recording 2 shutouts in that series. Game 6 of that series was a memorable duel between Potvin and Colorado goalie Patrick Roy, which the Kings and Potvin won 1–0 in double overtime.

Potvin again led the Kings to the 2002 playoffs, where they pushed the Colorado Avalanche to 7 games (rallying from a 3–1 series deficit) in the 1st round.

In September 2003, Potvin was signed to a one-year contract by the Boston Bruins. He backed-up Calder Memorial Trophy Winner Andrew Raycroft during the 2003–04 season. Coincidentally, Raycroft broke Potvin's record for consecutive games played by a Maple Leafs goalie during the 2006–07 season. Early in the 2005–06 season, the Atlanta Thrashers were in talks with Potvin in hopes of signing him after starting goaltender Kari Lehtonen and backup goaltender Mike Dunham went down with injuries.  However, Potvin did not have equipment that conformed to the new NHL standards, nor did he wish to accept the two-way contract that was being offered to him, so the Thrashers instead decided to sign Steve Shields.

Coaching
Potvin currently lives with his wife Sabrina Tardif, and his three children Noemie, Xavier, and Felicia in Magog, Quebec, where he is the head coach for the midget AAA Magog Cantonniers who placed second at both the 2018 and 2019 Telus Cup.

Career statistics

Regular season and playoffs

International

Awards
1995–96 NHL All-Star Game
1993–94 NHL All-Star Game
1992–93 NHL All-Rookie Team
1991–92 AHL Dudley "Red" Garret Memorial Trophy
1991–92 AHL Baz Bastien Memorial Trophy
1990–91 CHL Goaltender of the Year
1990–91 QMJHL Jacques Plante Trophy
1990–91 QMJHL Guy Lafleur Trophy
1990–91 QMJHL Hap Emms Trophy

References

External links 
 
 Félix Potvin's biography at The Goaltender Home Page

1971 births
Boston Bruins players
Canadian ice hockey goaltenders
Chicoutimi Saguenéens (QMJHL) players
French Quebecers
Ice hockey people from Montreal
Living people
Los Angeles Kings players
National Hockey League All-Stars
New York Islanders players
People from Anjou, Quebec
St. John's Maple Leafs players
Toronto Maple Leafs draft picks
Toronto Maple Leafs players
Vancouver Canucks players